Downham Hall is an English country house in Downham, Lancashire, England.

Overview

Downham Hall was designed by George Webster (1797–1864) in 1835, though it was built on remains from the sixteenth century. It has two storeys and an attic. In terms of architectural style, it has Doric columns, window aprons, the shields of Henry de Lacy, 3rd Earl of Lincoln (1251–1311) and John of Gaunt, 1st Duke of Lancaster (1340–1399), a cornice, and architraves.

It is currently the private residence of Ralph John Assheton, 2nd Baron Clitheroe (born 1929).

It has been a Grade II* listed building since 13 December 1977.

See also

Grade II* listed buildings in Lancashire
Listed buildings in Downham, Lancashire

References

Grade II* listed buildings in Lancashire
Country houses in Lancashire
Buildings and structures in Ribble Valley